This article lists players who have captained the senior Cork county football team in the Munster Senior Football Championship and the All-Ireland Senior Football Championship. The captain is no longer chosen from the club that has won the Cork Senior Football Championship.

List of captains

See also
 List of Cork senior ladies' Gaelic football team captains

  
Gaelic football
Cork